Hina Altaf Khan (born 2 January 1992), also known by her married name Hina Aagha, is a Pakistani television actress, presenter and former video jockey. Altaf briefly hosted ARY Musik's teen show Girl's Republic. She is best known for her role as Zebo in Udaari, Eshal in Dil-e-Jaanam, Asma in Aatish, Zara in Dil-e-Gumshuda and Zoya in Rabba Mainu Maaf Kareen.

Personal life 

Hina Altaf was born on 2 January 1992 in the metropolitan city of Karachi.

On 22 May 2020, Altaf married Agha Ali with whom she has worked in Dil-e-Gumshuda (2019).

Career 

Altaf made her television debut as a VJ. She briefly host teen show Girls Republic on MTV Pakistan. She made her acting debut with a supporting role in the ARY Digital's melodrama Maryam Kese Jiye in 2015.

She subsequently starred as the titular character in the 2015 romance Ek Thi Misaal, and gained wider recognition for playing a rape victim in the highly successful social drama Udaari (2016), which ranks among the highest-rated Urdu dramas of all time.  Altaf has since played leading roles in several television series, including the romantic series Dil-e-Jaanam (2017), Gumrah (2017), Pagli (2017), Aatish (2018) and Dil-e-Gumshuda (2019).

Altaf briefly appeared in one episode of Angeline Malik's directorial anthology series Ustani Jee on Hum TV. She was also seen as a simple housewife in Rabba Mainu Maaf Kareen opposite Hammad Farooqui (2020) and as Husna in Geo Entertainment's Dikhawa (2020). Altaf co-hosted the fourth season of the musical show Battle of the Bands along with actor Ali Safina in 2019. She started her own YouTube channel in 2019, where she regularly uploads vlogs and behind the scene videos of her project shoots. In 2019, Altaf was named in the list of Sexiest Asian Woman by Eastern Eye.

Television

Anthology Series

Telefilm

Web series

Hosting

Awards and nominations

References

External links

Living people
1992 births
Pakistani female models
Pakistani television actresses
Actresses from Karachi
Iqra University alumni
Pakistani YouTubers